Ariina Mürkhain (born 22 June 1999) is an Estonian football defender who plays for
FC Flora and the Estonian women's national football team.

References 

1999 births
Living people
Estonian women's footballers
Estonia women's international footballers
Women's association football defenders
Footballers from Tallinn
FC Flora (women) players